Sir Gallahad (1920–1949) was a French Thoroughbred racehorse and an extremely important sire in the United States.

Racing career
Racing at age two in France for his British breeder/owner, Jefferson Davis Cohn, Sir Gallahad earned victory in three of his five starts but was overshadowed by the 1922 Champion colt, Epinard. At age three, he won four races, most notably the French 2,000 Guineas (Poule d'Essai des Poulains). At four, he won three important races in France and in England won the Lincolnshire Handicap. That year, he also went head-to-head with Epinard, winning a 6½ furlong event.

Leading Sire
Sir Gallahad was retired after his four-year-old season to stand at stud at Haras du Bois-Roussel in Alençon. In 1926, owner Jefferson Davis Cohn sold him to an American syndicate made up of Robert A. Fairbairn, William Woodward, Sr., Marshall Field III, and Arthur B. Hancock. In the United States, he was recorded as Sir Gallahad III for registration clarification. Although he was sent to the various breeding farms of his four owners, he stood primarily at Woodward's Belair Stud in Maryland and at Hancock's Claiborne Farm in Kentucky.

Sir Gallahad sired 65 Graded stakes race winners and was the United States Champion Sire four times. 

In addition, Sir Gallahad was the U.S. Champion Broodmare Sire a record 12 times, with his daughters producing 139 stakes winners including two Hall of Famer members: Challedon and Gallorette.

Sir Gallahad died at Claiborne Farm in 1949 and is buried in its equine cemetery.

Pedigree

References
 Sir Gallahad's pedigree and racing stats
 TIME magazine article August 7, 1939 on the purchased of Sir Gallahad by an American syndicate
 List of Leading Sires at the National Sporting Library's Thoroughbred Heritage website

1920 racehorse births
1949 racehorse deaths
Racehorses bred in France
Racehorses trained in France
United States Champion Thoroughbred Sires
American Champion Thoroughbred broodmare sires
Thoroughbred family 16-a
Chefs-de-Race